This is a list of films which have placed number one at the weekend box office in Venezuela during 2009.

Highest-grossing films

References

 

2009 in Venezuela
2009
Venezuela